The Jim Morris Barn is a historic barn on the south side of Arkansas Highway 66 in Timbo, Arkansas.  It is a two-story gambrel-roofed frame structure, with a stone foundation and board-and-batten exterior.  Built in a transverse crib plan, it has a narrow central path instead of a wide drive typical of the form.  Built c. 1900, it is unusual in having been designed specifically for the stabling of horses, rather than more general-purpose usage of most area barns.

The barn was listed on the National Register of Historic Places in 1985.

See also
National Register of Historic Places listings in Stone County, Arkansas

References

Barns on the National Register of Historic Places in Arkansas
Buildings and structures completed in 1900
Buildings and structures in Stone County, Arkansas
National Register of Historic Places in Stone County, Arkansas
1900 establishments in Arkansas